Ophichthus brasiliensis is an eel in the family Ophichthidae (worm/snake eels). It was described by Johann Jakob Kaup in 1856, originally under the genus Centrurophis. It is a marine, tropical eel which is known from Brazil, in the southwestern Atlantic Ocean (from which its species epithet is derived).

References

Eschmeyer, W.N. (ed.), 1998. Catalog of fishes. Special Publication, California Academy of Sciences, San Francisco. 3 vols. 2905 p.

brasiliensis
Taxa named by Johann Jakob Kaup
Fish described in 1856